Northern Electricity Distribution Company (NEDCO) is an electricity distribution utility company in Ghana. The company is a subsidiary of the Volta River Authority, the main electricity generation company in the country. The company is the sole supplier of electricity to the three Northern Regions of Ghana: Northern Region, Upper East Region and Upper West Region, Bono, Bono East, Ahafo Regions and part of the Asante and Volta Regions. The Electricity Company of Ghana supplies the other regions.

History
In response to the Power Sector Reforms (PSR) in 1997, NEDCo was formed out of NED and registered by VRA as a subsidiary. NEDCo was operationalized in May 2012.

Operational footprint
The operations of NEDCO cover over sixty percent of the total land area of Ghana. Its operations extend into the northern parts of Volta Region and Ashanti Region. It also supplies power to Dapaong in Togo, as well as the border towns of Po, Leo and Yuoga in Burkina Faso.

See also

 Electricity sector in Ghana

References

Volta River Authority
Electric power companies of Ghana
Electricity authorities